The seventh season of Nigerian Idol premiered in January 2022.  There hasn't been any winner so far.

Weekly Song Choices and Results

Top 12 (20 March)

Top 10: African Greats (27 March)

Top 9: Inspirations (03 April) 

The Top 10 performed "Stand Up" by Cynthia Erivo for their group performance.

Top 8: Greatest Soundtracks/This is Me (10 April) 

Yinka Daives was a guest judge of this live show.

Top 7: Showstopper (17 April) 

Ice Prince was a guest judge of this live show.

Top 6 (24 April) 

Fommer winner Kingdom and 2nd runner up were guest performers.

Top 5/4 (1 May)

Finalists
(ages stated at time of contest)

Elimination Chart

References

1. https://www.dstv.com/africamagic/en-ng/show/nigerian-idol. Official Site of the Nigerian Idol season 7.
2. https://www.idolssa.net/nigerian-idol-2022-season-7-top-12-contestants/. Meet the Top 12.
2022_Nigerian_television_seasons